was released in 1992 by Tecmo for the Super Nintendo Entertainment System console. A graphical update of the previous Family Computer video games, it also includes new features like a map of the pitch at the bottom of the screen. The  video game was never released outside Japan so there is no official English version.

References

1992 video games
Koutei no Chousen
Japan-exclusive video games
Super Nintendo Entertainment System games
Super Nintendo Entertainment System-only games
Tecmo games
Video game sequels
Video games developed in Japan
Multiplayer and single-player video games